Cause and Effect is the fifth studio album by English alternative rock band Keane, released on 20 September 2019 through Island Records. It is their first full-length album since Strangeland (2012) and hiatus from early 2014 to late 2018. Cause and Effect peaked at No.2 on the UK Albums Chart.

Promotion
The first single, "The Way I Feel", premiered on 6 June 2019 on BBC Radio 2 and YouTube.

The second single, "Love Too Much", premiered on 8 August 2019 on BBC Radio 2 and YouTube.

Critical reception

Cause and Effect received generally positive reviews from critics. At Metacritic, which assigns a normalised rating out of 100 to reviews from mainstream publications, the album received an average score of 68, based on 7 reviews, indicating "generally favorable reviews".

Neil Z. Yeung of AllMusic gave the album three and a half stars out of five, writing, "Not a game-changing comeback by any means, Cause and Effect is instead a satisfying return to form that manages to gracefully age Keane by invigorating a familiar formula with wisdom and honesty learned over a dramatic, life-changing decade."

Track listing

Personnel
Keane
 Tom Chaplin – vocals
 Tim Rice-Oxley – piano, keyboards, backing vocals
 Richard Hughes – drums, percussion, backing vocals
 Jesse Quin – bass guitar, keyboards, backing vocals

Charts

Certifications

References

2019 albums
Island Records albums
Keane (band) albums